Not by Chance may refer to:

Not by Chance (band)
Not by Chance (album), by Joe Martin